Mayfair Theatre may refer to:

 Fox Theatre (Portland, Oregon), a demolished theater in Portland previously named Mayfair Theatre
 Mayfair Music Hall, also known as Mayfair Theatre, a former vaudeville theater in Santa Monica, California, opened 1913
 Mayfair Theatre, Baltimore, a vacant theater structure in Baltimore, opened in 1941
 Mayfair Theatre, Dunedin, a live performance venue in Dunedin, New Zealand, opened 1914
 Mayfair Theatre, Ottawa, the oldest active movie theater in Ottawa, opened 1932
 Mayfair Theatre, Sydney, movie theatre in Australia, closed 1979
 Sony Hall, a former Broadway house previously named Mayfair Theatre opened 1938
 May Fair Theatre, in The May Fair Hotel, London